Keep it Quiet is a 1934 British crime film directed by Leslie S. Hiscott and starring Bertha Belmore, Frank Pettingell, Cyril Raymond and Davy Burnaby. It was made at Beaconsfield Studios as a quota quickie.

Plot summary
Joe Puddlefoot becomes involved with criminals trying to steal valuable jade pieces belonging to the distinguished Sir Charles Goode.

Cast
 Frank Pettingell as Joe Puddlefoot  
 Jane Carr as Nancy  
 Davy Burnaby as Sir Charles Good 
 Cyril Raymond as Jack  
 D. A. Clarke-Smith as Vendervell  
 Bertha Belmore as Mrs. Puddlefoot

References

Bibliography
 Chibnall, Steve. Quota Quickies: The Birth of the British 'B' Film. British Film Institute, 2007.
 Low, Rachael. Filmmaking in 1930s Britain. George Allen & Unwin, 1985.
 Wood, Linda. British Films, 1927-1939. British Film Institute, 1986.

External links
 

1934 films
1934 crime films
British crime films
1930s English-language films
Films directed by Leslie S. Hiscott
Films shot at Beaconsfield Studios
Quota quickies
British black-and-white films
1930s British films